Confil is a wet-laid nonwoven fabric made from a blend of polyester and cellulose. Although the product was too late to market to take advantage of the 1960s paper clothing fad, International Paper promoted it for general clothing use, positioning the product as superior to paper in feel and durability, but cheap enough to throw away. Despite limited adoption in the fashion industry, demand justified construction of a $16 million factory in Lewisburg, Pennsylvania to increase production volumes. As the price of cotton more than doubled during the 1970s, Confil found use in other specialty applications such as wallpaper, construction fabrics, and geotextiles. In the early 21st century, Confil is largely used in Filtration media.

References

External links
Confil television advertisement broadcast on CBS News during the Apollo 11 launch, 16 July 1969

Nonwoven fabrics
Cellulose
Polyesters